Fingerite is a copper vanadate mineral with formula: β-Cu2V2O5.  It was discovered as triclinic crystals occurring as volcanic sublimates around fumaroles in the crater of the Izalco Volcano, El Salvador. 

Associated minerals include thenardite, euchlorine, stoiberite, shcherbinaite, ziesite, bannermanite, chalcocyanite and chalcanthite. The mineral also dissolves in water.

Fingerite is named for Dr. Larry W. Finger (b. 1940) of the Geophysical Laboratory, Carnegie Institution of Washington.

References

Copper minerals
Vanadate minerals
Triclinic minerals
Minerals in space group 2